Punicafolin is an ellagitannin from the leaves of Punica granatum (pomegranate) and in Phyllanthus emblica.

Punicafolin is an isomer of tellimagrandin II and nupharin A, but the hexahydroxydiphenoyl group is not attached to the same hydroxyl groups in the glucose molecule.

Punicafolin has been shown to have tumor suppressive effects in dogs.

References 

Pomegranate ellagitannins